Otis Spann Is the Blues is an album by blues pianist and vocalist Otis Spann recorded in New York in 1960 and released by the Candid label.

Reception

AllMusic reviewer Ron Wynn stated "Spann provided wonderful, imaginative, tasty piano solos and better-than-average vocals, and was arguably the best player whose style was more restrained than animated. Not that he couldn't rock the house, but Spann's forte was making you think as well as making you dance, and the tracks on Otis Spann Is the Blues will do both".

Track listing
All compositions by Otis Spann except where noted
 "The Hard Way" − 5:02
 "Take a Little Walk with Me" (Robert Lockwood Jr.) − 3:25
 "Otis in the Dark" − 4:32
 "Little Boy Blue" (Lockwood) − 3:38
 "Country Boy" − 4:24
 "Beat-Up Team" − 5:59
 "My Daily Wish" (Lockwood) − 4:26
 "Great Northern Stomp" − 4:15
 "I Got Rumbling On My Mind #2" (Lockwood) − 4:02
 "Worried Life Blues" − 4:20

Personnel
Otis Spann − vocals, piano
Robert Lockwood Jr. − guitar, vocals

References

1960 albums
Otis Spann albums
Candid Records albums